The 2009 World Junior Ringette Championships, (2009 WJRC) also known as the U19 2009 World Championships, was an international ringette tournament and the first World Junior Ringette Championships organized by the International Ringette Federation (IRF) exclusively for elite junior national ringette teams. It was contested in Prague, Czech Republic, between August 4–8, 2009, at the Letňany Arena.

History
The World Junior Ringette Championships, known as the U19 World Championships, was a tournament organized by the International Ringette Federation (IRF) from 2009 to 2012 for elite international Junior ringette athletes. The competition was run as a separate tournament from the World Ringette Championships which was designed for adult players. The World Junior Ringette Championships no longer function as a separate event, having since merged in 2013 with the main World Ringette Championships program where both Senior and Junior divisions now exist.

Overview

The first World Junior Ringette Championships took place in August, 2009 in Prague, Czech Republic. Two Canadian teams, Canada West Under-19 and Canada-East Under-19 faced two Finnish teams, the Finland White Stars and the Finland Blue Stars. Canada East suffered a heartbreaking loss to the Finland White Stars at the gold medal final.

Venue
The tournament was contested in Prague, Czech Republic at the Letňany Arena.

Teams

Final standings

Rosters

Team Finland Junior
The first appearance by Finland in world junior competition took place during this tournament. Finland did not yet have an official junior national ringette team as its representative and sent two different junior teams instead: the Finland White Stars and the Finland Blue Stars. The tournament's leading scorer was Susanna Tapani with 15 goals and 9 assists for 24 points over 8 games.

Finland White Stars

Finland Blue Stars

Team Canada Junior
Canada was represented at the junior level by two separate teams: Team Canada East (Under-19), and Team Canada West (Under-19).

Team Canada East

Team Canada West

See also
 Canada national ringette team
 Finland national ringette team

References

World Ringette Championships
Ringette competitions
Ringette